Gun Control in the Third Reich may refer to:
History of firearms restrictions in Germany
Gun Control in the Third Reich (book)